The 1941 Belmont Stakes was the 73rd running of the Belmont Stakes. It was the 35th Belmont Stakes held at Belmont Park in Elmont, New York and was held on June 7, 1941. With a field of four horses, Whirlaway, the winner of that year's Kentucky Derby and Preakness Stakes, won the 1 –mile race (12 f; 2.4 km) by 2 lengths over Robert Morris. 

With the win, Whirlaway became the fifth Triple Crown champion.

Results

Payout

 Based on a $2 wager. No show wagers sold.

External links 
BelmontStakes.com

References

Belmont Stakes races
Belmont Stakes
Belmont Stakes
Belmont Stakes